Saroki is a village in the Gujrat District of Pakistan, on the Sargodha road just before the town of Kunjah. It is located on the bank of the Upper Jehlum canal, which runs into the Chenab river, one of the main five rivers in Punjab. Saroki is a majority Muslim community.

References

Populated places in Gujrat District